Ahmed Al-Dhefiri (born 9 January 1992) is a Kuwaiti professional footballer plays as a midfielder for Kuwait SC and the Kuwait national team.

International career

International goals
Scores and results list Kuwait's goal tally first.

Honors

Club

Al–Qadisa
 Kuwaiti Premier League (2): 2013–14, 2015–16
 Kuwait Federation Cup (1): 2018–19
 Kuwait Emir Cup (1): 2014–15
 Kuwait Crown Prince Cup (2): 2013–14, 2017–18
 Kuwait Super Cup (1): 2014
 AFC Cup (1): 2014

External links

Living people
1992 births
Kuwaiti footballers
Kuwaiti expatriate footballers
Expatriate footballers in Saudi Arabia
Kuwaiti expatriate sportspeople in Saudi Arabia
Kuwait international footballers
Association football midfielders
Al-Qadsiah FC players
Saudi Professional League players
Kuwait Premier League players
Qadsia SC players
Kuwait SC players